Francisco Campana (9 May 1925 – 23 January 1985) was an Argentine footballer. He played in one match for the Argentina national football team in 1947. He was also part of Argentina's squad for the 1947 South American Championship.

References

External links
 

1925 births
1985 deaths
Argentine footballers
Argentina international footballers
Place of birth missing
Association football forwards
Chacarita Juniors footballers
Boca Juniors footballers